Força de um Desejo is a Brazilian telenovela produced by Rede Globo, and was shown in the schedule of 18 hours between May 10, 1999 and January 29, 2000, in 227 chapters. It was written by Gilberto Braga and as collaborators with Alcides Nogueira and Sérgio Marques, Lilian Garcia, Eliane Garcia, Philip Miguez and Mark Silver and directed by Mauro Mendonça Filho, Carlos Araújo, Fabricio Mamberti and João Camargo, with production of the core Marcos Paulo.

Featured Malu Mader, Fábio Assunção, Cláudia Abreu, Marcelo Serrado, Selton Mello, Nathália Timberg, Lavínia Vlasak, Isabel Fillardis, Louise Cardoso, Reginaldo Faria, Denise Del Vecchio and Paulo Betti in leading roles.

Synopsis 
The setting is Paraíba Valley, Rio de Janeiro, in the nineteenth century. Higino Ventura (Paulo Betti) is a former peddler who enriched himself with shady dealings. Ventura bought the fazenda of Morro Alto ("Hill Top Plantation") in the town of Sant'Anna to approach his old flame, Helena (Sonia Braga), a resident of the neighbouring fazenda, Ouro Verde ("Golden Green"), now married to the powerful Baron Henry de Sampaio Sobral (Reginaldo Faria). Ventura is willing to do anything to win Helena back, including buying Ouro Verde and obtaining a noble title. Although Helena disregards Ventura for the love of her husband, she suffers at the hands of the Baron, who knows that his younger son, Abelardo (Selton Mello) is, actually, the son of Ventura.

The couple's legitimate son, Inácio (Fábio Assunção), does not conform to the cruel treatment that his father gives his mother and decides to leave the household. At Rio de Janeiro, he meets Ester Ramos Delamare (Malu Mader), a beautiful courtesan, and owner of the most famous saloon of the Court. They fall in love and live an intense romance to the point that Ester decides to leave her way of life just to live with Inácio. However, the unexpected death of his mother makes Inácio return to the plantation to help his father and brother. Moreover, he splits with Ester because of intrigues by his grandmother, Idalina Menezes Albuquerque Silveira (Nathália Timberg). Even though Idalina did not suspect Ester is a courtesan, she fears her grandson's involvement with a girl of lower social class. To destroy the romance, Idalina falsifies his grandson's signature and sends Ester a letter, convincing her that Inácio does not love her anymore.

Baron Sobral, devastated by the death of Helena and the feelings of guilt that torment him because he gave his wife a miserable life, decides to start a new life and makes a long trip to the Court. After meeting Ester, he falls in love with her without knowing she is the woman who is loved by his son. The Baron convinces Ester that it's not worth destroying her life over the disillusion that she is suffering. Willing to give her a chance to have a new life, Baron Sobral asks her to marry him. After the marriage is sanctified, Sobral and Ester return to Ouro Verde. Upon their arrival, Ester comes face to face with Inácio; victims of Idalina's schemes, the former lovers are forced to live in the same house, without the Baron suspecting that his new wife is the same woman his son had fallen in love with.

Ester and Inácio try to avoid each other but eventually end up clarifying the misunderstanding that separated them. They decide to tell Sobral the truth but end up not doing it upon discovery that the Baron is ill and he needs the help of his family more than ever. Dissatisfied with the situation and knowing that Ouro Verde is facing financial difficulties, Inácio marries Alice Ventura (Lavinia Vlasak), the daughter of Higino Ventura and his wife, dazzled Barbara (Denise Del Vecchio), whose only goal is becoming a noble.

Meanwhile, Ventura struggles to get the barony and purchase Ouro Verde in order to humiliate the Baron. He becomes obsessed with Olivia (Claudia Abreu), a young woman who arrives in the village of Sant'Anna. Snubbed by the girl, Ventura tries to find out who she is and he discovers that she is an enslaved woman who fled from another village and is being sought by the police. As she befriends Ester, more of her story is revealed — Olivia was born to a wealthy landowner and a light-skinned African enslaved woman. Her father recognized her as his daughter, and despite his family did not accept such a situation, he named her Ana Tambellini, educated her and wrote her a carta de libertad, a letter of manumission to acknowledge she was born free. Unfortunately, Olivia's father did not register the letter officially. When he died, his racist and envious eldest daughter tore the letter of manumission and wanted to make Ana a slave. For this reason, the girl ran away and changed her name to Olivia. However, Ventura, finding Olivia's sister and becoming aware of the whole story, decides to deliver her to the police only to buy her from her family in order to abuse Olivia as a sex slave. Olivia goes through Hell, unable to escape the clutches of her cruel owner despite the attempts of her boyfriend, the young doctor Mariano Xavier (Marcelo Serrado), and their friends, among them Inácio and Ester.

But one fact shocks the entire village of Sant'Anna: Baron Henry Sobral is murdered during the engagement party of Abelardo and sweet Juliana (Julia Feldens). This is the same night Inácio and Ester flee to live together after knowing about the farce of Sobral's disease — fearful of losing his wife, the Baron made the disease up as a way to prevent Ester to leave him. Local police mobilized to arrest Inácio, the prime suspect in the death of Baron Sobral. Then begins a race against time to spare Inácio pay for the crime he did not commit. His friends and allies are trying to uncover the identity of the real killer.

Cast

Cameo 
 Cast in alphabetical order

References

External links

1999 Brazilian television series debuts
2000 Brazilian television series endings
1999 telenovelas
TV Globo telenovelas
Brazilian telenovelas
Telenovelas by Gilberto Braga
Portuguese-language telenovelas